Lepidophyma sylvaticum,  the Madrean tropical night lizard, is a species of lizard in the family Xantusiidae. It is a small lizard found in Mexico.

References

Lepidophyma
Reptiles of Mexico
Reptiles described in 1939
Taxa named by Edward Harrison Taylor